Howard John Edward "Cowboy" Young (August 2, 1937 – November 24, 1999) was a Canadian professional ice hockey player and actor, best known for his time in the National Hockey League with the Detroit Red Wings in the 1960s.

Playing career

Early years in Detroit
Young broke into the Red Wings lineup in the 1960–61 season and soon earned a reputation as one of the toughest, most promising, and most troubled young defenders in the sport. He was blessed with a high level of natural skill and was one of the most fearsome bodycheckers in the game, but was tremendously undisciplined both on an off the ice, and a constant headache to the Detroit organization. He recorded 8 assists in his rookie season, and led the Wings with 108 penalty minutes in only 29 games. In the playoffs, he appeared in all eleven games and scored two goals to help the Red Wings reach the Stanley Cup Finals.

He split another season between the NHL and the minors before establishing himself as a regular in 1962–63. That year he recorded nine points in 62 games and set the league record for penalty minutes, recording 273 to break Lou Fontinato's old record of 202. His pugilistic exploits earned him a place on the cover of Sports Illustrated in January 1963.

However, his drinking had by this point reached full-blown alcoholism, and despite his popularity in Detroit the team shipped him to the Chicago Black Hawks in the summer of 1963.

Los Angeles
Young's problems followed him to Chicago, and the Black Hawks' patience ran out even quicker than Detroit's did. Midway through the 1963–64 season, the team sold him to the Los Angeles Blades of the Western Hockey League.  There he was one of the league's most feared defenders; he led the league in penalty minutes in both his full seasons there while contributing offensively from the blueline. Handsome and charismatic, he also tried acting, with a minor role in the film None But The Brave, starring Frank Sinatra .

In 1965, Young's life bottomed out, and he entered Alcoholics Anonymous. After sobering up, his play on the ice showed a marked improvement, and he finally began to harness his immense potential. He also improved his discipline on the ice and focused more on the game and less on fisticuffs.

Return to the NHL
Young started the 1966–67 season dominating the WHL, with 22 points in his first 29 games. More impressively, the once-volatile defender spent just 43 minutes in the penalty box. Impressed with his sobriety and improved play, the Red Wings traded three players to Los Angeles to reacquire him.

Back in the NHL for the first time in three years, Young played the best hockey of his career. In 44 games for the Red Wings, he recorded 3 goals and 14 assists for 17 points along with 100 penalty minutes. In 1967–68, he would spend another full season in Detroit, setting career highs with 17 assists and 19 points.

He was then dealt to Oakland before being re-acquired by Chicago for the 1968–69 season, where he began to show his age. Now 32, he slumped to just 10 points in 57 games and seemed to have lost his physical edge. He spent most of the following two seasons in the minors, with an 11-game stint with the Vancouver Canucks in 1970–71, before retiring.

Comeback, WHA years and retirement
After a year away from the sport, Young signed on with the WHL Phoenix Roadrunners. Despite being 35 and having played defence for most of his career, he returned as a forward, and was surprisingly successful. In 1972–73, he scored 20 goals and 38 assists for 58 points for the Roadrunners. In 1973–74, he was better yet, scoring 37 goals (sixth in the league) and 68 points, and was named a WHL First-Team All-Star.

In the 1974–75 season, the Roadrunners became a member of the World Hockey Association, and Young stayed with the team through the move. Now 37 and playing top-level pro hockey for the first time in five years, he recorded 15 points in 30 games before being sold mid-season to the Winnipeg Jets. In Winnipeg he was reunited with his former Chicago teammate Bobby Hull, and delivered 13 goals in 42 games. He finished the year with 16 goals and 22 assists for 38 points in 72 games.

Young retired again in 1975, but returned to Phoenix late in the 1976–77 season. Nearly 40, he scored just one goal and four points in 26 games. He played low-level minor pro hockey for another two seasons in Phoenix and Los Angeles before retiring again in 1979. He made yet another comeback in 1985–86 with the Flint Spirits of the IHL, picking up an assist in 4 games, an impressive feat at the age of nearly 50 in a league just a notch below the NHL.

Later life
After retirement, Young moved to New Mexico where he owned a ranch and drove a school bus. He also worked as an actor; in 1989, he played an outlaw on the television mini-series Lonesome Dove, in 1990 he portrayed Poe Possey in the movie Young Guns II, and in 1997 he appeared with Tom Selleck in the 1997 television film Last Stand at Saber River.

Young died November 24, 1999, at age 62, from pancreatic cancer.

Career statistics

Regular season and playoffs

References

External links
 
 
 Howie Young at Detroit Red Wings

1937 births
1999 deaths
Canadian expatriate ice hockey players in the United States
Canadian ice hockey defencemen
Chicago Blackhawks players
Detroit Red Wings players
Edmonton Flyers (WHL) players
Hamilton Tiger Cubs players
Hershey Bears players
Kitchener Canucks players
Los Angeles Blades (WHL) players
Phoenix Roadrunners (WHA) players
Phoenix Roadrunners (WHL) players
Rochester Americans players
San Diego Gulls (WHL) players
Sportspeople from Scarborough, Toronto
Ice hockey people from Toronto
Vancouver Canucks (WHL) players
Vancouver Canucks players
Winnipeg Jets (WHA) players